Priori may refer to:
 Priori, members of the government of Renaissance Florence and other Italian cities, or Prioria, or Signoria, elected by picking eligible names out of a leather bag, or borse, -- at random, for a term of two months.  
 A priori